GDP-D-glucose phosphorylase is an enzyme with systematic name GDP:alpha-D-glucose 1-phosphate guanylyltransferase. This enzyme catalyses the following chemical reaction

 GDP-alpha-D-glucose + phosphate  alpha-D-glucose 1-phosphate + GDP

The enzyme may be involved in prevention of misincorporation of glucose in place of mannose residues into glycoconjugates.

References

External links 
 

EC 2.7.7